is the ninth single by Japanese idol duo Wink. Written by Neko Oikawa and Yuki Kadokura, the single was released on November 21, 1990, by Polystar Records.

Background and release 
"New Moon ni Aimashou" was used by Panasonic for their RQ-S45 headphone commercial. The B-side is "Mizu no Seiza", a Japanese-language cover of the Tricia Leigh Fisher song "Let an Angel".

"New Moon ni Aimashou" became Wink's second consecutive single to peak at No. 2 on the Oricon's weekly charts. It sold over 249,000 copies and was certified Gold by the RIAJ.

Track listing 
All lyrics are written by Neko Oikawa; all music is arranged by Satoshi Kadokura.

Chart positions 
Weekly charts

Year-end charts

Certifications

References

External links 
 
 

1990 singles
1990 songs
Wink (duo) songs
Japanese-language songs
Songs with lyrics by Neko Oikawa